Tony Bond (born 3 August 1953 in Urmston, Manchester), is a former rugby union international who represented England from 1978 to 1982.

Rugby union career
Bond started his rugby career playing for Broughton Park and moved to Sale during the 1977–78 season. He toured Canada with the England Under-23 team in May 1977 and scored tries in both internationals against the Canada national rugby union team. He made his international debut on 25 November 1978 at Twickenham in the England vs New Zealand match. Of the 6 matches he played for his national side he was only on the winning side on one occasion, and the four defeats including two to Ireland and two to New Zealand. He played his final match for England on 6 February 1982 at Twickenham in the England vs Ireland match.

He was a member of the famous North team which beat the All Blacks at Otley on 17 November 1979. He was one of four current or past Broughton Park players in this side and was joined by former teammates Tony Neary, Kevin O'Brien and Jim Syddall in the second row.

References

1953 births
Living people
English rugby union players
England international rugby union players
Lancashire County RFU players
North of England Rugby Union team
Rugby union centres
Rugby union players from Urmston